The Kyan Sittha-class frigate (or Kyansitta or Kyan-Sit-Thar class) is a class of guided missile stealth frigates operated by the Myanmar Navy. UMS Kyansitta (F12) is the first Myanmar Navy frigate that has reduced radar cross section features on its design. The ship incorporates various electronic suite and weaponry system from India, China and Russia. The lead ship of the class is named after Kyansittha, king of Pagan Dynasty of Myanmar (Burma).

The first frigate (F12) was commissioned on 31 March 2014, two days after the launch of the second frigate UMS  Sinphyushin (F14), which was named after Sinphyushin, king of Konbaung Dynasty of Myanmar.

Ships of the class

Notes

References

Ship classes built by Myanmar Navy
Frigates of the Myanmar Navy
Frigate classes
Post–Cold War military equipment of Myanmar